

Events

Pre-1600
 221 – Liu Bei, Chinese warlord, proclaims himself emperor of Shu Han, the successor of the Han dynasty.
 392 – Emperor Valentinian II is assassinated while advancing into Gaul against the Frankish usurper Arbogast. He is found hanging in his residence at Vienne. 
 589 – King Authari marries Theodelinda, daughter of the Bavarian duke Garibald I. A Catholic, she has great influence among the Lombard nobility.
 756 – Abd al-Rahman I, the founder of the Arab dynasty that ruled the greater part of Iberia for nearly three centuries, becomes emir of Cordova, Spain.
1252 – Pope Innocent IV issues the papal bull ad extirpanda, which authorizes, but also limits, the torture of heretics in the Medieval Inquisition.
1525 – Insurgent peasants led by Anabaptist pastor Thomas Müntzer were defeated at the Battle of Frankenhausen, ending the German Peasants' War in the Holy Roman Empire.
1536 – Anne Boleyn, Queen of England, stands trial in London on charges of treason, adultery and incest; she is condemned to death by a specially-selected jury.

1601–1900
1602 – Cape Cod is sighted by English navigator Bartholomew Gosnold.
1618 – Johannes Kepler confirms his previously rejected discovery of the third law of planetary motion (he first discovered it on March 8 but soon rejected the idea after some initial calculations were made).
1648 – The Peace of Münster is ratified, by which Spain acknowledges Dutch sovereignty.
1791 – French Revolution: Maximilien Robespierre proposes the Self-denying Ordinance.
1817 – Opening of the first private mental health hospital in the United States, the Asylum for the Relief of Persons Deprived of the Use of Their Reason (now Friends Hospital, Philadelphia, Pennsylvania).
1836 – Francis Baily observes "Baily's beads" during an annular eclipse.
1849 – The Sicilian revolution of 1848 is finally extinguished.
  1850   – The Arana–Southern Treaty is ratified, ending "the existing differences" between Great Britain and Argentina.
1851 – The first Australian gold rush is proclaimed, although the discovery had been made three months earlier.
1864 – American Civil War: Battle of New Market, Virginia: Students from the Virginia Military Institute fight alongside the Confederate army to force Union General Franz Sigel out of the Shenandoah Valley.
1891 – Pope Leo XIII defends workers' rights and property rights in the encyclical Rerum novarum, the beginning of modern Catholic social teaching.

1901–present
1905 – The city of Las Vegas founded in Nevada, United States.
1911 – In Standard Oil Co. of New Jersey v. United States, the United States Supreme Court declares Standard Oil to be an "unreasonable" monopoly under the Sherman Antitrust Act and orders the company to be broken up.
  1911   – More than 300 Chinese immigrants are killed in the Torreón massacre when the forces of the Mexican Revolution led by Emilio Madero take the city of Torreón from the Federales.
1918 – The Finnish Civil War ends when the Whites took over Fort Ino, a Russian coastal artillery base on the Karelian Isthmus, from the Russian troops.
1919 – The Winnipeg general strike begins. By 11:00, almost the whole working population of Winnipeg had walked off the job.
  1919   – Greek occupation of Smyrna. During the occupation, the Greek army kills or wounds 350 Turks; those responsible are punished by Greek commander Aristides Stergiades.
1929 – A fire at the Cleveland Clinic in Cleveland, Ohio kills 123.
1932 – In an attempted coup d'état, the Prime Minister of Japan Inukai Tsuyoshi is assassinated.
1933 – All military aviation organizations within or under the control of the RLM of Germany were officially merged in a covert manner to form its Wehrmacht military's air arm, the Luftwaffe.
1940 –  is recommissioned. It was originally the USS Squalus.
  1940   – World War II: The Battle of the Netherlands: After fierce fighting, the poorly trained and equipped Dutch troops surrender to Germany, marking the beginning of five years of occupation.
  1940   – Richard and Maurice McDonald open the first McDonald's restaurant.
1941 – First flight of the Gloster E.28/39 the first British and Allied jet aircraft.
1942 – World War II: In the United States, a bill creating the Women's Army Auxiliary Corps (WAAC) is signed into law.
1943 – Joseph Stalin dissolves the Comintern (or Third International).
1945 – World War II: The Battle of Poljana, the final skirmish in Europe is fought near Prevalje, Slovenia.
1948 – Following the expiration of The British Mandate for Palestine, the Kingdom of Egypt, Transjordan, Lebanon, Syria, Iraq and Saudi Arabia invade Israel thus starting the 1948 Arab–Israeli War.
1957 – At Malden Island in the Pacific Ocean, Britain tests its first hydrogen bomb in Operation Grapple.
1963 – Project Mercury: The launch of the final Mercury mission, Mercury-Atlas 9 with astronaut Gordon Cooper on board. He becomes the first American to spend more than a day in space, and the last American to go into space alone.
1970 – President Richard Nixon appoints Anna Mae Hays and Elizabeth P. Hoisington the first female United States Army generals.
1972 – The Ryukyu Islands, under U.S. military governance since its conquest in 1945, reverts to Japanese control.
1974 – Ma'alot massacre: Members of the Democratic Front for the Liberation of Palestine attack and take hostages at an Israeli school; a total of 31 people are killed, including 22 schoolchildren.
1988 – Soviet–Afghan War: After more than eight years of fighting, the Soviet Army begins to withdraw 115,000 troops from Afghanistan.
1991 – Édith Cresson becomes France's first female Prime Minister.
1997 – The United States government acknowledges the existence of the "Secret War" in Laos and dedicates the Laos Memorial in honor of Hmong and other "Secret War" veterans.
  1997   – The Space Shuttle Atlantis launches on STS-84 to dock with the Russian space station Mir.
2001 – A CSX EMD SD40-2 rolls out of a train yard in Walbridge, Ohio, with 47 freight cars, including some tank cars with flammable chemical, after its engineer fails to reboard it after setting a yard switch. It travels south driverless for 66 miles (106 km) until it was brought to a halt near Kenton. The incident became the inspiration for the 2010 film Unstoppable.
2004 – Arsenal F.C. go an entire league campaign unbeaten in the English Premier League, joining Preston North End F.C. with the right to claim the title "The Invincibles".
2008 – California becomes the second U.S. state after Massachusetts in 2004 to legalize same-sex marriage after the state's own Supreme Court rules a previous ban unconstitutional.
2010 – Jessica Watson becomes the youngest person to sail, non-stop and unassisted around the world solo.
2013 – An upsurge in violence in Iraq leaves more than 389 people dead over three days.

Births

Pre-1600
1397 – Sejong the Great, Korean king of Joseon (d. 1450)
1531 – Maria of Austria, Duchess of Jülich-Cleves-Berg (d. 1581)
1565 – Hendrick de Keyser, Dutch sculptor and architect (d. 1621)
1567 – Claudio Monteverdi, Italian priest and composer (d. 1643)

1601–1900
1608 – René Goupil, French-American missionary and saint (d. 1642)
1633 – Sébastien Le Prestre de Vauban, French noble (d. 1707)
1645 – George Jeffreys, 1st Baron Jeffreys, British judge (d. 1689)
1689 – Lady Mary Wortley Montagu, English writer (d. 1762)
1720 – Maximilian Hell, Hungarian priest and astronomer (d. 1792)
1749 – Levi Lincoln Sr., American lawyer and politician, 4th United States Attorney General (d. 1820)
1759 – Maria Theresia von Paradis, Austrian pianist and composer (d. 1824)
1770 – Ezekiel Hart, Canadian businessman and politician (d. 1843)
1773 – Klemens von Metternich, German-Austrian politician, 1st State Chancellor of the Austrian Empire (d. 1859)
1786 – Dimitris Plapoutas, Greek general and politician (d. 1864)
1803 – Juan Almonte, son of José María Morelos, was a Mexican soldier and diplomat who served as a regent in the Second Mexican Empire (1863-1864) (d. 1869)
1805 – Samuel Carter, English railway solicitor and Member of Parliament (MP) (d. 1878)
1808 – Michael William Balfe, Irish composer and conductor (d. 1870)
1817 – Debendranath Tagore, Indian philosopher and author (d. 1905)
1841 – Clarence Dutton, American commander and geologist (d. 1912)
1845 – Élie Metchnikoff, Russian zoologist (d. 1916)
1848 – Viktor Vasnetsov, Russian painter and illustrator (d. 1926)
1854 – Ioannis Psycharis, Ukrainian-French philologist and author (d. 1929)
1856 – L. Frank Baum, American novelist (d. 1919)
  1856   – Matthias Zurbriggen, Swiss mountaineer (d. 1917)
1857 – Williamina Fleming, Scottish-American astronomer and academic (d. 1911)
1859 – Pierre Curie, French physicist and academic, Nobel Prize laureate (d. 1906)
1862 – Arthur Schnitzler, Austrian author and playwright (d. 1931)
1863 – Frank Hornby, English businessman and politician, invented Meccano (d. 1936)
1869 – Paul Probst, Swiss target shooter (d. 1945)
  1869   – John Storey, Australian politician, 20th Premier of New South Wales (d. 1921) 
1873 – Oskari Tokoi, Finnish socialist and the Chairman of the Senate of Finland (d. 1963)
1882 – Walter White, Scottish international footballer (d. 1950)
1890 – Katherine Anne Porter, American short story writer, novelist, and essayist (d. 1980)
1891 – Mikhail Bulgakov, Russian novelist and playwright (d. 1940)
  1891   – Hjalmar Dahl, Finnish journalist, translator and writer (d. 1960)
  1891   – Fritz Feigl, Austrian-Brazilian chemist and academic (d. 1971)
1892 – Charles E. Rosendahl, American admiral (d. 1977)
  1892   – Jimmy Wilde, Welsh boxer (d. 1969)
1893 – José Nepomuceno, Filipino filmmaker, founder of Philippine cinema (d. 1959)
1894 – Feg Murray, American hurdler and cartoonist (d. 1973)
1895 – Prescott Bush, American captain, banker, and politician (d. 1972)
  1895   – William D. Byron, American lieutenant and politician (d. 1941)
1898 – Arletty, French model, actress, and singer (d. 1992)
1899 – Jean Étienne Valluy, French general (d. 1970)
1900 – Ida Rhodes, American mathematician, pioneer in computer programming (d. 1986)

1901–present
1901 – Xavier Herbert, Australian author (d. 1984)
  1901   – Luis Monti, Argentinian-Italian footballer and manager (d. 1983)
1902 – Richard J. Daley, American lawyer and politician, 48th Mayor of Chicago (d. 1976)
  1902   – Sigizmund Levanevsky, Soviet aircraft pilot of Polish origin (d. 1937)
1903 – Maria Reiche, German mathematician and archaeologist (d. 1998)
1904 – Clifton Fadiman, American game show host and author (d. 1999)
1905 – Joseph Cotten, American actor (d. 1994)
  1905   – Albert Dubout, French cartoonist, illustrator, painter, and sculptor (d. 1976)
  1905   – Abraham Zapruder, American businessman and amateur photographer, filmed the Zapruder film (d. 1970)
1907 – Sukhdev Thapar, Indian activist (d. 1931)
1909 – James Mason, English actor, producer, and screenwriter (d. 1984)
  1909   – Clara Solovera, Chilean singer-songwriter (d. 1992)
1910 – Constance Cummings, British-based American actress (d. 2005)
1911 – Max Frisch, Swiss playwright and novelist (d. 1991)
  1911   – Herta Oberheuser, German physician (d. 1978)
1912 – Arthur Berger, American composer and educator (d. 2003)
1914 – Turk Broda, Canadian ice hockey player and coach (d. 1972)
  1914   – Angus MacLean, Canadian farmer and politician, 25th Premier of Prince Edward Island (d. 2000)
  1914   – Norrie Paramor, English composer, producer, and conductor (d. 1979)
1915 – Hilda Bernstein, English-South African author and activist (d. 2006)
  1915   – Paul Samuelson, American economist and academic, Nobel Prize laureate (d. 2009)
  1915   – Henrik Sandberg, Danish production manager and producer (d. 1993)
1916 – Vera Gebuhr, Danish actress (d. 2014)
1918 – Eddy Arnold, American singer-songwriter, guitarist, and actor (d. 2008)
  1918   – Arthur Jackson, American lieutenant and target shooter (d. 2015)
  1918   – Joseph Wiseman, Canadian-American actor (d. 2009)
1920 – Michel Audiard, French director and screenwriter (d. 1985)
1921 – Federico Krutwig, Basque writer, member of ETA and translator (d. 1998)
1922 – Sigurd Ottovich Schmidt, Russian historian and ethnographer (d. 2013)
  1922   – Jakucho Setouchi, Japanese nun and author (d. 2021)
1923 – Richard Avedon, American sailor and photographer (d. 2004)
  1923   – John Lanchbery, English-Australian composer and conductor (d. 2003)
1924 – Maria Koepcke, German-Peruvian ornithologist and zoologist (d. 1971)
1925 – Andrei Eshpai, Russian pianist and composer (d. 2015)
  1925   – Mary F. Lyon, English geneticist and biologist (d. 2014)
  1925   – Carl Sanders, American soldier, pilot, and politician, 74th Governor of Georgia (d. 2014)
  1925   – Roy Stewart, Jamaican-English actor and stuntman (d. 2008)
1926 – Clermont Pépin, Canadian pianist, composer, and educator (d. 2006)
  1926   – Anthony Shaffer, English author, playwright, and screenwriter (d. 2001)
  1926   – Peter Shaffer, English playwright and screenwriter (d. 2016)
1930 – Jasper Johns, American painter and sculptor
1931 – Ken Venturi, American golfer and sportscaster (d. 2013)
  1931   – James Fitz-Allen Mitchell, Vincentian politician and agronomist, 2nd Prime Minister of Saint Vincent and the Grenadines (d. 2021)
1935 – Don Bragg, American pole vaulter (d. 2019)
  1935   – Ted Dexter, Italian-English cricketer (d. 2021)
  1935   – Utah Phillips, American singer-songwriter and guitarist (d. 2008)
  1935   – Akihiro Miwa, Japanese singer, actor, director, composer, author and drag queen
1936 – Anna Maria Alberghetti, Italian-American actress and singer
  1936   – Mart Laga, Estonian basketball player (d. 1977)
  1936   – Ralph Steadman, English painter and illustrator
  1936   – Paul Zindel, American playwright and novelist (d. 2003)
1937 – Madeleine Albright, Czech-American politician and diplomat, 64th United States Secretary of State (d. 2022)
  1937   – Karin Krog, Norwegian singer
  1937   – Trini Lopez, American singer, guitarist, and actor (d. 2020)
1938 – Mireille Darc, French actress, director, and screenwriter (d. 2017)
  1938   – Nancy Garden, American author (d. 2014)
1939 – Dorothy Shirley, English high jumper and educator
1940 – Roger Ailes, American businessman (d. 2017)
  1940   – Lainie Kazan, American actress and singer
  1940   – Don Nelson, American basketball player and coach
1941 – Jaxon, American illustrator and publisher, co-founded the Rip Off Press (d. 2006)
1942 – Lois Johnson, American singer-songwriter (d. 2014)
  1942   – Jusuf Kalla, Indonesian businessman and politician, 10th Vice President of Indonesia
  1942   – Doug Lowe, Australian politician, 35th Premier of Tasmania
  1942   – K. T. Oslin, American singer-songwriter and actress (d. 2020)
1943 – Paul Bégin, Canadian lawyer and politician
  1943   – Freddie Perren, American songwriter, producer, and conductor (d. 2004)
1944 – Bill Alter, American police officer and politician
  1944   – Ulrich Beck, German sociologist and academic (d. 2015)
1945 – Michael Dexter, English hematologist and academic
  1945   – Jerry Quarry, American boxer (d. 1999)
1946 – Thadeus Nguyễn Văn Lý, Vietnamese priest and activist
1947 – Graeham Goble, Australian singer-songwriter, guitarist and producer
1948 – Kate Bornstein, American author, playwright, performance artist, and gender theorist
  1948   – Yutaka Enatsu, Japanese baseball player
  1948   – Brian Eno, English singer-songwriter, keyboard player, and producer
  1948   – Kathleen Sebelius, American politician, 44th Governor of Kansas
1949 – Frank L. Culbertson Jr., American captain, pilot, and astronaut
  1949   – Robert S.J. Sparks, English geologist and academic
1950 – Jim Bacon, Australian politician, 41st Premier of Tasmania (d. 2004)
  1950   – Jim Simons, American golfer (d. 2005)
1951 – Dennis Frederiksen, American singer-songwriter (d. 2014)
  1951   – Chris Ham, English political scientist and academic
  1951   – Frank Wilczek, American mathematician and physicist, Nobel Prize laureate
1952 – Chazz Palminteri, American actor, director, producer, and screenwriter
1953 – George Brett, American baseball player and coach
  1953   – Athene Donald, English physicist and academic
  1953   – Mike Oldfield, English-Irish singer-songwriter, guitarist, and producer 
1954 – Diana Liverman, English-American geographer and academic
  1954   – Caroline Thomson, English journalist and broadcaster
1955 – Mohamed Brahmi, Tunisian politician (d. 2013)
  1955   – Lia Vissi, Cypriot singer-songwriter and politician
1956 – Andreas Loverdos, Greek lawyer and politician, Greek Minister of Labour
  1956   – Dan Patrick, American television anchor and sportscaster 
  1956   – Kevin Greenaugh, American nuclear engineer
1957 – Meg Gardiner, American-English author and academic
  1957   – Juan José Ibarretxe, Spanish politician
  1957   – Kevin Von Erich, American football player and wrestler
1958 – Jason Graae, American musical theater actor
  1958   – Ruth Marcus, American journalist
  1958   – Ron Simmons, American football player and wrestler
1959 – Khaosai Galaxy, Thai boxer and politician
  1959   – Luis Pérez-Sala, Spanish race car driver
  1959   – Beverly Jo Scott, American-Belgian singer-songwriter
1960 – Rhonda Burchmore, Australian actress, singer, and dancer
  1960   – Rob Bowman, American director and producer
  1960   – R. Kuhaneswaran, Sri Lankan politician
  1960   – Rimas Kurtinaitis, Lithuanian basketball player and coach
1961 – Giselle Fernández, Mexican-American television journalist.
1962 – Lisa Curry, Australian swimmer 
1963 – Gavin Nebbeling, South African footballer
1964 – Lars Løkke Rasmussen, Danish lawyer and politician, 40th Prime Minister of Denmark
1965 – André Abujamra, Brazilian singer-songwriter and guitarist
  1965   – Scott Tronc, Australian rugby league player
1966 – Jiří Němec, Czech footballer
1967 – Simen Agdestein, Norwegian chess grandmaster and football player
  1967   – Laura Hillenbrand, American journalist and author
  1967   – John Smoltz, American baseball player and sportscaster
  1967   – Madhuri Dixit, Indian actress
1968 – Cecilia Malmström, Swedish academic and politician, 15th European Commissioner for Trade
  1968   – Sophie Raworth, English journalist and broadcaster
1969 – Hideki Irabu, Japanese-American baseball player (d. 2011)
  1969   – Emmitt Smith, American football player and sportscaster
1970 – Frank de Boer, Dutch footballer and manager
  1970   – Ronald de Boer, Dutch footballer and manager
  1970   – Desmond Howard, American football player and sportscaster
  1970   – Alison Jackson, English photographer, director, and screenwriter
  1970   – Rod Smith, American football player
  1970   – Ben Wallace, English captain and politician
1971 – Karin Lušnic, Slovenian tennis player
1972 – Danny Alexander, Scottish politician, Secretary of State for Scotland
  1972   – David Charvet, French actor and singer
1974 – Vasilis Kikilias, Greek basketball player and politician
  1974   – Matthew Sadler, English chess player and author
  1974   – Marko Tredup, German footballer and manager
  1974   – Ahmet Zappa, American musician and writer
1975 – Ray Lewis, American football player and sportscaster
  1975   – Ales Michalevic, Belarusian lawyer and politician
  1975   – Janne Seurujärvi, Finnish Sami  politician, and the first Sami ever to be elected to the Finnish Parliament.
1976 – Torraye Braggs, American basketball player
  1976   – Mark Kennedy, Irish footballer
  1976   – Jacek Krzynówek, Polish footballer
  1976   – Ryan Leaf, American football player and coach
  1976   – Anže Logar, Slovenian politician
  1976   – Tyler Walker, American baseball player
1978 – Amy Chow, American gymnast and pediatrician
  1978   – Dwayne De Rosario, Canadian soccer player 
  1978   – Edu, Brazilian footballer
  1978   – David Krumholtz, American actor 
1979 – Adolfo Bautista, Mexican footballer
  1979   – Daniel Caines, English sprinter
  1979   – Chris Masoe, New Zealand rugby player
  1979   – Ryan Max Riley, American skier 
  1979   – Robert Royal, American football player
  1979   – Dominic Scott, Irish guitarist
1980 – Josh Beckett, American baseball player
1981 – Patrice Evra, French footballer
  1981   – Paul Konchesky, English international footballer
  1981   – Justin Morneau, Canadian baseball player
  1981   – Zara Phillips, English equestrian 
  1981   – Jamie-Lynn Sigler, American actress and singer
1982 – Veronica Campbell-Brown, Jamaican sprinter
  1982   – Segundo Castillo, Ecuadorian footballer
  1982   – Rafael Pérez, Dominican baseball player
  1982   – Layal Abboud, Lebanese singer
1984 – Jeff Deslauriers, Canadian ice hockey player
  1984   – Sérgio Jimenez, Brazilian race car driver
  1984   – Samantha Noble, Australian actress
  1984   – Beau Scott, Australian rugby league player
  1984   – Mr Probz, Dutch singer, songwriter, rapper, actor and record producer 
1985 – Cristiane, Brazilian footballer
  1985   – Tania Cagnotto, Italian diver
  1985   – Laura Harvey, English football coach
  1985   – Tathagata Mukherjee, Indian actor
  1985   – Denis Onyango, Ugandan football goalkeeper
  1985   – Justine Robbeson, South African javelin thrower
1986 – Thomas Brown, American football player
  1986   – Matías Fernández, Chilean footballer
  1986   – Adam Moffat, Scottish footballer
1987 – David Adams, American baseball player
  1987   – Michael Brantley, American baseball player
  1987   – Brian Dozier, American baseball player
  1987   – Mark Fayne, American ice hockey player
  1987   – Ersan İlyasova, Turkish basketball player
  1987   – Leonardo Mayer, Argentinian tennis player
  1987   – Andy Murray, Scottish tennis player
1988 – Indrek Kajupank, Estonian basketball player
  1988   – Scott Laird, English footballer
  1989 – Susan Soonkyu Lee, Korean-American singer and entertainer
1989   – Mapou Yanga-Mbiwa, French footballer
1990 – Jordan Eberle, Canadian ice hockey player
  1990   – Lee Jong-hyun, Korean guitarist
  1990   – Stella Maxwell, New Zealand model 
1993 – Jeremy Hawkins, New Zealand rugby league player
  1993   – Tomáš Kalas, Czech international footballer
1996 – Birdy, English singer-songwriter
1997 – Ousmane Dembélé, French footballer
  1997   – Scott Drinkwater, Australian rugby league player
1998 – Lucrezia Stefanini, Italian tennis player
1999 – Anastasia Gasanova, Russian tennis player
2000 – Dayana Yastremska, Ukrainian tennis player
2002 – Chase Hudson, American internet celebrity, singer, actor

Deaths

Pre-1600
 392 – Valentinian II, Roman emperor (b. 371)
 558 – Hilary of Galeata, Christian monk (b. 476)
 884 – Marinus I, pope of the Catholic Church (b. 830) 
 913 – Hatto I, German archbishop (b. 850)
 926 – Zhuang Zong, Chinese emperor (b. 885)
 973 – Byrhthelm, bishop of Wells 
1036 – Go-Ichijō, emperor of Japan (b. 1008)
1157 – Yuri Dolgorukiy, Grand Prince of Kiev (b. 1099)
1175 – Mleh, prince of Armenia
1174 – Nur ad-Din, Seljuk emir of Syria (b. 1118)
1268 – Peter II, count of Savoy (b. 1203)
1461 – Domenico Veneziano, Italian painter (b. c. 1410)
1464 – Henry Beaufort, 3rd Duke of Somerset (b. 1436)
1470 – Charles VIII, king of Sweden (b. 1409)
1585 – Niwa Nagahide, Japanese samurai (b. 1535)

1601–1900
1609 – Giovanni Croce, Italian composer and educator (b. 1557)
1615 – Henry Bromley, English politician (b. 1560)
1634 – Hendrick Avercamp, Dutch painter (b. 1585)
1698 – Marie Champmeslé, French actress (b. 1642)
1699 – Sir Edward Petre, 3rd Baronet, English politician (b. 1631)
1700 – John Hale, American minister (b. 1636)
1740 – Ephraim Chambers, English publisher (b. 1680)
1773 – Alban Butler, English priest and hagiographer (b. 1710)
1845 – Braulio Carrillo Colina, Costa Rican lawyer and politician, Head of State of Costa Rica (b. 1800)
1879 – Gottfried Semper, German architect and educator, designed the Semper Opera House (b. 1803)
1886 – Emily Dickinson, American poet and author (b. 1830)

1901–present
1914 – Ida Freund, Austrian-born chemist and educator (b. 1863)
1919 – Hasan Tahsin, Turkish journalist (b. 1888)
1924 – Paul-Henri-Benjamin d'Estournelles de Constant, French diplomat and politician, Nobel Prize laureate (b. 1852)
1926 – Joseph James Fletcher, Australian biologist (b. 1850)
1928 – Umegatani Tōtarō I, Japanese sumo wrestler, the 15th Yokozuna (b. 1845)
1935 – Kazimir Malevich, Ukrainian-Russian painter and theoretician (b. 1878)
1937 – Philip Snowden, 1st Viscount Snowden, English politician, Chancellor of the Exchequer (b. 1864)
1945 – Kenneth J. Alford, English soldier, bandmaster, and composer (b. 1881)
  1945   – Charles Williams, English author, poet, and critic (b. 1886)
1948 – Edward J. Flanagan, Irish-American priest, founded Boys Town (b. 1886)
1954 – William March, American soldier and author (b. 1893)
1955 – Harry J. Capehart, American lawyer, politician, and businessperson (b. 1881)
1956 – Austin Osman Spare, English painter and magician (b. 1886)
1957 – Keith Andrews, American race car driver (b. 1920)
  1957   – Dick Irvin, Canadian ice hockey player and coach (b. 1892)
1963 – John Aglionby, English-born Bishop of Accra and soldier (b. 1884)
1964 – Vladko Maček, Croatian lawyer and politician (b. 1879)
1965 – Pio Pion, Italian businessman (b. 1887)
1967 – Edward Hopper, American painter (b. 1882)
  1967   – Italo Mus, Italian painter (b. 1892)
1969 – Joe Malone, Canadian ice hockey player (b. 1890)
1971 – Tyrone Guthrie, English director, producer, and playwright (b. 1900)
1978 – Robert Menzies, Australian lawyer and politician, 12th Prime Minister of Australia (b. 1894)
1980 – Gordon Prange, American historian and author (b. 1910)
1982 – Gordon Smiley, American race car driver (b. 1946)
1984 – Francis Schaeffer, American pastor, theologian, and philosopher (b. 1912)
1985 – Jackie Curtis, American actress and writer (b. 1947)
1986 – Elio de Angelis, Italian race car driver (b. 1958)
  1986   – Theodore H. White, American historian, journalist, and author (b. 1915)
1989 – Johnny Green, American composer and conductor (b. 1908)
  1989   – Luc Lacourcière, Canadian ethnographer and author (b. 1910)
1991 – Andreas Floer, German mathematician and academic (b. 1956)
  1991   – Amadou Hampâté Bâ, Malian ethnologist and author (b. 1901)
  1991   – Fritz Riess, German race car driver (b. 1922)
1993 – Salah Ahmed Ibrahim, Sudanese poet and diplomat (b. 1933)
1994 – Gilbert Roland, American actor (b. 1905)
1995 – Eric Porter, English actor (b. 1928)
1996 – Charles B. Fulton, American lawyer and judge (b. 1910)
1998 – Earl Manigault, American basketball player (b. 1944)
  1998   – Naim Talu, Turkish economist, banker, politician, 15th Prime Minister of Turkey (b. 1919)
2003 – June Carter Cash, American singer-songwriter, guitarist, and actress (b. 1929)
2006 – Nizar Abdul Zahra, Iraqi footballer (b. 1961)
2007 – Jerry Falwell, American pastor, founded Liberty University (b. 1933)
2008 – Tommy Burns, Scottish footballer and manager (b. 1956)
  2008   – Alexander Courage, American composer and conductor (b. 1919)
  2008   – Will Elder, American illustrator (b. 1921)
2009 – Bud Tingwell, Australian actor, director, and producer (b. 1923)
  2009   – Wayman Tisdale, American basketball player and bass player (b. 1964)
2010 – Besian Idrizaj, Austrian footballer (b. 1987)
  2010   – Loris Kessel, Swiss race car driver (b. 1950)
2012 – Carlos Fuentes, Mexican novelist and essayist (b. 1928)
  2012   – Arno Lustiger, German historian and author (b. 1924)
  2012   – Zakaria Mohieddin, Egyptian soldier and politician, 33rd Prime Minister of Egypt (b. 1918)
2013 – Henrique Rosa, Bissau-Guinean politician, President of Guinea-Bissau (b. 1946)
2014 – Jean-Luc Dehaene, French-Belgian politician, 63rd Prime Minister of Belgium (b. 1940)
  2014   – Noribumi Suzuki, Japanese director and screenwriter (b. 1933)
2015 – Elisabeth Bing, German-American physical therapist and author (b. 1914)
  2015   – Jackie Brookner, American sculptor and educator (b. 1945)
  2015   – Flora MacNeil, Scottish Gaelic singer (b. 1928)
  2015   – Garo Yepremian, Cypriot-American football player (b. 1944)
2020 – Fred Willard, American actor, comedian, and writer (b. 1933)
2021 – Oliver Gillie, British journalist and scientist (b. 1937)
2022 – Frank Curry, Australian rugby league player and coach (b. 1950)
 2022   – Kay Mellor, English actress (b. 1951)

Holidays and observances
Aoi Matsuri (Kyoto)
Army Day (Slovenia)
Christian feast day:
Achillius of Larissa
Athanasius of Alexandria (Coptic Church)
Dymphna
Hallvard Vebjørnsson (Roman Catholic Church)
Hesychius of Cazorla
Hilary of Galeata
Isidore the Laborer, celebrated with festivals in various countries, the beginning of bullfighting season in Madrid.
Jean-Baptiste de La Salle (Roman Catholic Church)
Peter, Andrew, Paul, and Denise (Roman Catholic Church)
Reticius (Roman Catholic Church)
Sophia of Rome (Roman Catholic church)
May 15 (Eastern Orthodox liturgics)
Constituent Assembly Day (Lithuania)
Independence Day (Paraguay), celebrates the independence of Paraguay from Spain in 1811. Celebrations for the anniversary of the independence begin on Flag Day, May 14.
International Conscientious Objectors Day
International Day of Families (International)
La Corsa dei Ceri begins on the eve of the feast day of Saint Ubaldo. (Gubbio)
Mother's Day (Paraguay)
Nakba Day (Palestinian communities)
Peace Officers Memorial Day (United States)
Republic Day (Lithuania)
Teachers' Day (Colombia, Mexico and South Korea)

References

External links

 BBC: On This Day
 
 Historical Events on May 15

Days of the year
May